The 2010 Vladikavkaz bombing took place at the Central market in Vladikavkaz, North Ossetia–Alania, Russia on 9 September 2010 when a suicide car bomber detonated his explosives killing at least 17 and injuring more than 160.

Background
The Central market has been a target of terrorist attacks twice: in 1999, when a car explosion killed 52 people, and in 2008, when a female suicide bomber detonated herself at the bus stop near the market, claiming the lives of 12 people and injuring 41.

Attack
A second bomb discovered in a car near the site of the first explosion was successfully defused.

Investigation
The remains of the suicide attacker's decapitated corpse were discovered. Russia's president, Dmitry Medvedev, condemned the attack as "monstrous". The prime minister, Vladimir Putin, said the attack was designed to "sow enmity between our citizens". He called on Russia's substantial Muslim population to make a "decisive contribution" in the fight against extremism.

Casualties 
At least 4 ethnic Armenians, including 1 Armenian citizen, were among the dead. Armenians were also among the injured.

See also
List of terrorist incidents, 2010
1999 Vladikavkaz bombing
2008 Vladikavkaz bombing

References

External links
 (AFP via Sydney Morning Herald)

21st-century mass murder in Russia
Attacks in Russia in 2010
Mass murder in 2010
Insurgency in the North Caucasus
History of North Ossetia–Alania
Suicide car and truck bombings in Europe
Terrorist incidents in Russia in 2010
Gas explosions in Russia
September 2010 events in Russia
Marketplace attacks
Terrorist incidents in Vladikavkaz